For a Minute may refer to:
 For a Minute (B.G. song)
 For a Minute (M.O song)